Neil Anderson may refer to:

Government
 Neil Anderson (Illinois politician) (born 1982), American politician in the Illinois State Senator
 Neil Anderson (Idaho politician) (born 1947), American politician in the Idaho State Representative
 Neil Anderson (RNZN officer) (1927–2010), New Zealand Chief of Naval Staff

Others
 Neil Anderson (cricketer) (born 1979), Irish cricketer
 Neil Anderson (author), Sheffield-based author/journalist
 Neil T. Anderson, theologian and  author on spiritual freedom
 Neil Anderson (musician), former member of Seven Nations

See also
Neal Anderson (born 1964), American football player
 Neil L. Andersen (born 1951), junior member of the Quorum of the Twelve Apostles of The Church of Jesus Christ of Latter-day Saints